Jericho Jonas "Koko" Bendigo Nograles (born April 23, 1981) is a Filipino congressman and official spokesperson for the Puwersa ng Bayang Atleta (PBA) Partylist. He is the Assistant Majority Leader of the House of Representatives of the Philippines. He is one of the 70 representatives who voted to deny the franchise renewal of ABS-CBN.

Personal life 

Koko Nograles was born on April 23, 1981 in Davao City to Prospero Nograles, a former Speaker of the House of Representatives of the Philippines, and Rhodora Burgos Bendigo Nograles.

Educational background 

Nograles earned an undergraduate degree and a Bachelor of Science in Legal Management degree at the Ateneo de Manila University (1999–2003) and completed a Master in Business Administration degree at the University of Western Australia (2008–2012). Nograles also holds a Doctorate in Public Administration from the Sulu State College.

Political career 
In 2016, Nograles ran for and won a seat as congressman for the Puwersa ng Bayaning Atleta (PBA) Partylist. That same year, he was designated as legislative caretaker of the 1st District of Sulu, where he still serves as caretaker until today. In 2019, he was re-elected as a congressman. Nograles currently serves as the Assistant Majority Leader of the Congress of the Philippines.

Nograales is an active member of 12 congressional committees (such as the Committees on Rules, Justice, Good Government and Public Accountability, Housing and Urban Development, National Defense and Security, Public Order and Safety, and Ways and Means). Nograles is the principal author of more than 160 House bills and resolutions and co-author of 157 more. Some of these House bills, such as the Free College Education Act, Free Irrigation Service Act, Free WiFi Access Act, Occupational Safety and Health Standards Act, 10-Year Passport Validity Act, National ID Act, National Mental Health Act, and the Electric Cooperative Emergency Fund Act, were signed into law.

In November 2018, Nograles was designated as the caretaker representative of the 1st District of Davao City.

On July 10, 2020, Nograles was one of the 70 Congressman who voted to reject the franchise renewal of ABS-CBN, in favor of a report from Technical Working Group.

References 

1981 births
21st-century Filipino politicians
Party-list members of the House of Representatives of the Philippines
Politicians from Davao del Sur
Living people
People from Davao City
Ateneo de Manila University alumni